The arrondissement of Sartène is an arrondissement of France in the Corse-du-Sud department in the territorial collectivity of Corsica. It has 43 communes.

Composition

The communes of the arrondissement of Sartène, and their INSEE codes, are:

 Altagène (2A011)
 Arbellara (2A018)
 Argiusta-Moriccio (2A021)
 Aullène (2A024)
 Belvédère-Campomoro (2A035)
 Bilia (2A038)
 Bonifacio (2A041)
 Carbini (2A061)
 Cargiaca (2A066)
 Casalabriva (2A071)
 Conca (2A092)
 Figari (2A114)
 Foce (2A115)
 Fozzano (2A118)
 Giuncheto (2A127)
 Granace (2A128)
 Grossa (2A129)
 Lecci (2A139)
 Levie (2A142)
 Loreto-di-Tallano (2A146)
 Mela (2A158)
 Moca-Croce (2A160)
 Monacia-d'Aullène (2A163)
 Olmeto (2A189)
 Olmiccia (2A191)
 Petreto-Bicchisano (2A211)
 Pianottoli-Caldarello (2A215)
 Porto-Vecchio (2A247)
 Propriano (2A249)
 Quenza (2A254)
 Sainte-Lucie-de-Tallano (2A308)
 San-Gavino-di-Carbini (2A300)
 Santa-Maria-Figaniella (2A310)
 Sari-Solenzara (2A269)
 Sartène (2A272)
 Serra-di-Scopamène (2A278)
 Sollacaro (2A284)
 Sorbollano (2A285)
 Sotta (2A288)
 Viggianello (2A349)
 Zérubia (2A357)
 Zonza (2A362)
 Zoza (2A363)

History

The arrondissement of Sartène was created as part of the department Liamone in 1800. Between 1811 and 1976 it was an arrondissement of the department Corse, since 1976 it has been an arrondissement of the department Corse-du-Sud. In March 2017 it lost the commune Olivese to the arrondissement of Ajaccio.

As a result of the reorganisation of the cantons of France which came into effect in 2015, the borders of the cantons are no longer related to the borders of the arrondissements. The cantons of the arrondissement of Sartène were, as of January 2015:

 Bonifacio
 Figari
 Levie
 Olmeto
 Petreto-Bicchisano
 Porto-Vecchio
 Sartène
 Tallano-Scopamène

References

Sartene